The Acropolis Rally of Greece is a rally competition that is part of the World Rally Championship (WRC). The rally is held on very dusty, rough, rocky and fast mountain roads in mainland Greece, usually during the Greek hot summer period. The rally is best known for being extremely tough on the competing cars and drivers.

History
The Acropolis Rally has been held since 1951 by the Greek Motorsports Organization Automobile and Touring Club of Greece (ELPA), making it one of the longest-standing competitions in world rallying. Many world renown drivers have won this event including Walter Röhrl, Björn Waldegård, Ari Vatanen, Stig Blomqvist, Juha Kankkunen, Carlos Sainz and Colin McRae, among others.

Due to the nature of the race, with a mix of rough, twisty, fast mountain stages and coupled with blistering heat and choking dust, the Acropolis Rally is one of the toughest on the European and World Rally circuits. The cars used in the race must be built with extra sturdiness in order to cope with the fast but rock-strewn stages. Drivers and co-drivers also have to contend with the pounding terrain and high summer temperatures which often reached 50 °C within the cockpit. Many drivers rate the event as a test of skill, patience, bravery and endurance in the past, going as far as comparing the Acropolis with the infamous Safari Rally.

Super Special Stages (SSS)
The Rally is also known for having used great Super Special Stages over the years.

This trend started with the Marlboro Super Stage held in the city of Anavissos, south of Athens, in the early 90's. After the event base moved to Itea and Lamia in the early 2000's, a Super Special Stage was used in the outskirts of Lilea Parnassos. 
In 2005 a new stage was introduced; a superspecial stage held within the Athens Olympic Stadium. The Super Special Stage (SSS) was the highlight of the rally as well as the 2005 WRC schedule and in the same year, the Acropolis Rally was awarded the “Rally of the Year” title. It was loved by drivers and fans alike, as the packed stadium provided an "arena" feeling to the stage.

In 2006 there were 2 superspecials, again in the same stadium. The rally headquarters and the service park also moved from Lamia to the Athens Olympic Sports Complex. In the 2007 event, the superspecial (along with the rally headquarters and the service park) moved to the Markopoulo Olympic Equestrian Centre. In 2008 the super special stage was held twice at the Tatoi military airport. In 2018, a superspecial was based again in the Markopoulo Olympic Equestrian Centre. 

In the 2022 event, the rally made a return to the Athens Olympic Stadium for the rally-opening super special stage.

Historic locations
The Acropolis Rally started out as a marathon/endurance type event back in the early 50's. When the rally became part of the World Rally Championship after 1973, the crews had to face up to 800 competitive kilometers, in some of the most gruelling stages and conditions imaginable. This trip involved locations all over Greece up to the late 80's, such as the more known Kalambaka and Meteora, stages near Mount Olympus, Attica, Central Greece, and even down south in the Peloponnese. The traditional start always took place under the legendary Acropolis in Athens, and the finish ceremony was carried out in the Panathenaic stadium.

Recent years
With rallies ever so shrinking due to the new demands of the World Rally Championship and transitioning to "sprint" type events, the Acropolis Rally followed suit, basing the whole rally in certain areas and using stages nearby. The classic rally headquarters in the 90's and early 2000's were the cities of Lamia and Itea.
In 2005, the rally headquarters and the service park moved from Lamia to the Athens Olympic Sports Complex and then in the 2007 event, the rally headquarters and the service park moved to the Markopoulo Olympic Equestrian Centre. In 2008, the headquarters where situated at the Tatoi military airport, and that was the last time since that the rally was based in Attica, and that special stages were used in that area. In 2009 the rally headquarters and the service park were moved to the Greek city of Loutraki near the Corinth Canal with stages in Argolis and Corinthia used for the rally. For the 2016 ERC Season, the rally headquarters were moved back to the classic and much loved mountain stages near Lamia.

Classic stages
The best stages in Greece are undoubtedly in the Phthiotis and Phokis regions, mainly around the Parnassus and Giona mountains. Recently used stages like Bauxites/Karoutes, Pavliani, Kaloskopi, Rengini, Eleftherohori and Moschokarya are favorites amongst drivers and fans alike, due to their fast and flowing nature, allowing the cars to reach their full potential, in a rally where it is otherwise risky to push hard, due to the hard surface which can damage the cars heavily. The same goes for other famous rally stages in Greece , like the Kineta and Aghi Theodori stages around the Geraneia mountains in Corinthia, Prodromos, Livadeia and Thiva in Boeotia, Parnonas in mainland Peloponnese. Other honorable mentions include the fast and beautiful Parnitha stage, the car breaker Ymitos, plus the Assopia and Aghia Sotira stages in Attica, as well as the spectacular Meteora stage which was last used in the late 80's in the longer version of the rally. Several stages feature significant archeological landmarks like the "Klenia-Mycenae" stage which includes the Archeological site of Mycenae. It's worth mentioning, that many favourite classic special stages (f.e. Grammeni Oxia, Gardiki, Hani Zagana, Evangelistria, Prodromos, Aliki, Loukissia) were asphalt paved at some point in the past, so it is no longer possible for them to be used in the Acropolis Rally, since it is a mainly gravel-based event.

The "Tarzan" test in Evrytania
This special stage, originally called the Fourna and Rentina test, is an unusually difficult 30.3 km test. The name "Tarzan" originates from Giorgos Burgos, who was from Fourna in Evritania, lived in Athens and was a police officer. He suffered from tuberculosis and was given a few months to live. He then moved to Fourna, and reached the age of 92. The Acropolis rally passed through the hut of Giorgos, whose nickname was "Tarzan", from the 22nd edition of the rally in 1975. At that time the special route was called "Fourna". The stage first appeared under the new name "Tarzan" in the 26th Acropolis Rally in 1979, in honor of Giorgos Bourgos, who was by then a well known and liked figure amongst the drivers and the organisers of the event. The presence of the full stage in the rally was continuous until the 42nd running of
the event in 1995. For its last four years the route was renamed "Rentina-Tarzan", after using the second half of the classic 30,3km (finishing in Tsoukka).

In the Acropolis Rally of 2003, when the event reached its 50th anniversary, a shortened 20.65km version of the stage, called "New Tarzan", was held twice, paying tribute to the route's legacy in the event.

Didier Auriol in June 1991, dismantled a wheelrim and his suspension there, losing the lead and the overall victory in the race. Nevertheless, he later stated that "Tarzan" was his favorite Acropolis Rally special stage.

The  Tarzan stage returns in the 2021 Acropolis Rally, as the Power Stage of the event, together with many other classic tests.

Return to the WRC in 2021
In August 2020, rumours started to emerge about the possible return of the rally to the World Rally Championship. Greek Prime Minister Kyriakos Mitsotakis assured that the government was ready to support the organizers financially. In late December of the same year, the Hellenic Ministry of Sport agreed with the Organizing Committee for Motorsport to revive the Acropolis Rally.

In March 2021, it was officially announced that the Acropolis Rally of Gods would return for the 2021 World Rally Championship, taking place in September of the same year, with Lamia as the host city.

Winners

Number of victories per driver and manufacturer (WRC only)

Since 1973, the first WRC season.

References

External links

 
 Previous Acropolis Rallies
 History of the Acropolis Rally
 Acropolis Rally of Greece at wrc.com 
  Official organizers' site
 Historic Acropolis Rally
 Acropolis Rally Results
 Rajd Akropolu blisko WRC 
 Μαθήματα ιστορίας: Ειδική “Ταρζάν”

 
Recurring sporting events established in 1951
World Rally Championship rallies
European Rally Championship rallies